The following is the squad list for the 2015 FIFA U-20 World Cup. Each squad consisted of 21 players in total, 3 of whom had to be goalkeepers.

Those marked in bold have been capped at full International level.

Group A

Head coach:  Darren Bazeley

Head coach:  Oleksandr Petrakov

Head coach:  Tab Ramos

Head coach:  Gerd Zeise

Group B

Head coach:  Humberto Grondona

Head coach:  Leonardo Pipino

Head coach:  Sellas Tetteh

Head coach:  Andreas Heraf

Group C

Head coach:  Félix Sánchez Bas

Head coach:  Carlos Restrepo

Head coach:  Hélio Sousa

1. Nélson Monte was called up before the tournament began due to an injury to Dinis Almeida.

Head coach:  Juan Gallo

Group D

Head coach:  Sergio Almaguer

Head coach:  Fanyeri Diarra

Head coach:  Fabián Coito

Head coach:  Veljko Paunović

Group E

Head coach:  Manu Garba

Alexandre Gallo was Brazil's coach when the players list was released. He was eventually fired on 8 May and replaced by Rogério Micale.
Kenedy was forced out of the squad due to appendicitis and Malcom was called as his replacement on May 17.

Head coach:  Rogério Micale

Head coach:  An Ye-gun

The squad was announced on 15 May 2015.

Head coach:  Bernd Storck

Group F

The squad was announced on 15 May 2015.

Head coach:  Frank Wormuth

Head coach:  Frank Farina

Head coach:  Ravshan Khaydarov

Head coach:  Jorge Jiménez

External links
Official Squad list at FIFA.com
Official site at FIFA.com

References 

FIFA U-20 World Cup squads
squads